Rod Hacon is a disabled skier from Australia. In 1996, at the World Skiing Championships, Hacon won a bronze medal in the sit-ski slalom.

At the 1992 Winter Paralympics, he competed in two events where he did not finish in the  Men's Giant Slalom LW11 and Men's Slalom LW11. At the 1994 Winter Paralympics, he competed in four events - fifth in the Men's Downhill LWXII, fourth in the Men's Super-G LWXII  and did not finish in the Men's Giant Slalom LWXII and Men's Slalom LWXII.

See also 
 Australia at the Paralympics
 Disabled sports

References

Bibliography 

 

Australian male skiers
Paralympic alpine skiers of Australia
Alpine skiers at the 1992 Winter Paralympics
Alpine skiers at the 1994 Winter Paralympics
Living people
Australian male alpine skiers
Year of birth missing (living people)